Vietnamese iced coffee is a traditional Vietnamese coffee recipe. It is created using coffee roasted between medium and dark. The drink is made by passing hot water through the grounds into a cup that already contains condensed milk. To serve the cold drink, ice is added to the cup.

Variations

Variations involve additions of ice, sugar or condensed milk. A popular variation is cà phê sữa đá (or nâu đá in the North), which is iced coffee served with sweetened condensed milk. This is done by putting two to three teaspoons or more of condensed milk into the cup prior to the drip filter process. Other variations include:

 Black coffee (hot or cold) - Cà phê đen
 White coffee/Saigon style coffee - bạc xỉu: Hot or iced milk with some added coffee, similar to a macchiato. Popular in Saigon.
 Pandan coffee - Cà phê lá dứa: Made with coffee, Pandan paste, and honey. 
 Coconut coffee - Cà phê dừa: Made with coffee, coconut milk, and condensed milk. 
 Blended coffee/Coffee shake - Sinh tố cà phê- 
 Egg coffee - Cà phê trứng: Made with brewed coffee, chicken egg yolk, and condensed milk. It has a similar taste and texture to tiramisu and eggnog. Popular in Hanoi.
 Salted cream coffee - Cà phê kem mặn: a variation from Huế. 
 Avocado coffee - Cà phê bơ: coffee grounds, avocado, condensed milk, and vanilla powder

History

Coffee was introduced into Vietnam in 1857 by a French Catholic priest in the form of a single Coffea arabica tree. The beverage was adopted with regional variations.  Because of limitations on the availability of fresh milk, as the dairy farming industry was still in its infancy, the French and Vietnamese began to use sweetened condensed milk with a dark roast coffee.

Vietnam did not become a major exporter of coffee until the Đổi Mới reforms and opening of the economy after the war. Now, many coffee farms exist across the central highlands. Vietnam is now the largest producer of the Robusta variety of coffee and the second largest producer of coffee worldwide.

Vietnamese Coffee Chains

See also

 Egg coffee 
 Cuban espresso, similar sweetened coffee.
 Indian filter coffee, similarly produced (drip from metal filter) coffee.
 List of coffee beverages

References

External links

 Cà phê sữa đá, it's what's should be in your cup [sic] at ChestBrew.com
 History of Vietnamese Coffee and photographed step-by-step brewing at HungryHuy.com
 Illustrated instructions at wanderingspoon.com
 Vietnamese coffee recipe and notes at Coffeefaq.com

Vietnamese drinks
Coffee drinks
1857 introductions